Georges Émile Pierre Jehan Denis Vallerey Sr. (2 December 1902 – 11 June 1956) was a French swimmer. He competed at the 1924 Summer Olympics in the 200 m breaststroke event, but failed to reach the final. His son Georges Vallerey Jr. and daughter Gisèle Vallerey also became Olympic swimmers.

References

1902 births
1956 deaths
French male breaststroke swimmers
Olympic swimmers of France
Swimmers at the 1924 Summer Olympics